Sven Erik Bystrøm (born 21 January 1992, in Haugesund) is a Norwegian road bicycle racer, who currently rides for UCI WorldTeam . He was the 2014 Under-23 World Road Race Champion.

He signed with the Continental level  in 2012. He was named in the startlist for the 2016 Vuelta a España. He also started the 2017 Vuelta a Espana but crashed out with a broken shoulder on stage 7.

In 2018, he joined  on an initial two-year contract. In July 2019, he was named in the startlist for the 2019 Tour de France.

Major results

2009
 1st  Overall Grenland Grand Prix
1st Stage 2
 2nd Ringerike GP Juniors
 2nd U6 Cycle Tour Tidaholm Juniors
2010
 3rd Road race, National Junior Road Championships
 10th Overall Regio-Tour Juniors
1st Stage 3
2011
 5th Himmerland Rundt
2012
 1st Eschborn-Frankfurt City Loop U23
 2nd Road race, National Under-23 Road Championships
 8th Rogaland GP
2013
 3rd Road race, National Under-23 Road Championships
 4th Baronie Breda Classic
 7th Ringerike GP
2014
 1st  Road race, UCI Road World Under-23 Championships
 2nd Ringerike GP
 3rd Eschborn-Frankfurt City Loop U23
 6th Hadeland GP
 6th Baronie Breda Classic
 7th ZLM Tour
 9th Ronde van Drenthe
 10th Overall Tour of Norway
 10th Overall Tour des Fjords
 10th Ronde van Vlaanderen U23
2015
 1st Prologue (TTT) Tour of Austria
 1st  Young rider classification, Circuit Cycliste Sarthe
2016
 7th Le Samyn
 8th Overall Tour of Qatar
2017
 2nd Road race, National Road Championships
2020
 1st  Road race, National Road Championships
2021
 6th Trofeo Calvia
 10th Overall Tour of Norway
2022
 9th Overall Volta ao Algarve
  Combativity award Stage 2 Tour de France
2023
 7th Overall Tour Down Under

Grand Tour general classification results timeline

References

External links
 

1992 births
Living people
People from Haugesund
Norwegian male cyclists
Cyclists at the 2016 Summer Olympics
Olympic cyclists of Norway
Sportspeople from Rogaland
21st-century Norwegian people